"Für Danzig" ("For Danzig") was the official national anthem of the Free City of Danzig (now Gdańsk, Poland) from 1920-1939. The lyrics were written by Paul Enderling, while the music was by Georg Göhler. After the invasion of Poland and the concurrent annexation of Danzig by Nazi Germany in 1939, Deutschlandlied was adopted as the official anthem, along with the Horst-Wessel-Lied.

 Another song – In Danzig was also a semi-official anthem of the Free City, which had words by Josef von Eichendorff set to the traditional tune.

Lyrics

External links
Original recording 1934, MP3 format, Source: Danzig-online.pl 
National Anthems
In Danzig
Wikisource: In Danzig

Historical national anthems
History of Gdańsk
German songs
Free City of Danzig
German patriotic songs
European anthems
Songs about Germany